Ulrika Westerlund (born 1972) is a Swedish politician. She was elected as Member of the Riksdag in September 2022. She represents the constituency of Stockholm Municipality. She is affiliated with the Green Party.

References

External links 
 

Living people
1972 births
Place of birth missing (living people)
21st-century Swedish politicians
21st-century Swedish women politicians
Members of the Riksdag 2022–2026
Members of the Riksdag from the Green Party
Women members of the Riksdag